Jake Krack (born 1984) son of Reed and Dara Krack, is a prominent young old-time fiddler and fiddle teacher from Nicut in the U.S. state of West Virginia. He began fiddling at age six or eight. His teachers include Bobby Taylor, Lester McCumbers, Melvin Wine, Brad Leftwich, Joe Thompson, Wilson Douglas, and Glen Smith.

Musical career 
He received a B.A. degree from Berea College in Kentucky in 2007, where his friends called him "Jack". He has had two internships: at the Smithsonian Institution with music archivist Jeff Place and with the West Virginia Humanities Council, working on the Mountain Music Heritage Project.

Krack performed on the A Prairie Home Companion radio program in 1998, and on the Mountain Stage radio program in 2000. Also in 2000 he performed at the Millennium Stage of the John F. Kennedy Center for the Performing Arts. He performed at MerleFest in 2002 and in the 2003 Smithsonian Folklife Festival.

He has won first place in old-time fiddle at the Galax Fiddlers Convention in Galax, Virginia (2003, 2006, and 2008), the Henry Reed Festival (2007), the Clifftop festival in Clifftop, Fayette County, West Virginia (2006), the Mount Airy Fiddlers' Convention in Mount Airy, North Carolina (2002, 2004, and 2009), and the under-60 category at the Vandalia Gathering in Charleston, West Virginia (2002).

He compiled, arranged, and co-produced the 2007 Smithsonian Folkways CD Classic Old-time Fiddle From Smithsonian Folkways, and coproduced Lester McCumbers' CD Old Timey.

He was featured in The New York Times in 1999 and appeared in the 2004 PBS documentary Soundmix: Five Young Musicians.

Discography

As leader
Second Time Around
Hope I'll Join the Band
Wire Fire
Home at Last
One More Time
How 'bout that
Git er Done

With Todd Clewell
Jake's Ramble

With The Hog Hollar Stringband
The Great Compromise

With Doug Van Gundy
Two Far Gone

Compilations
Oasis Acoustic: Volume 1 (4-CD set)

Films
2004 - Soundmix: Five Young Musicians

References

External links
Jake Krack official site
Article in The New York Times, October 10, 1999

Video
Clifftop documentary featuring Jake Krack

Appalachian old-time fiddlers
People from Calhoun County, West Virginia
1984 births
Berea College alumni
Living people
Musicians from West Virginia
21st-century American violinists
Male violinists
21st-century American male musicians